The 1960 San Diego State Aztecs football team represented San Diego State College during the 1960 NCAA College Division football season.

San Diego State competed in the California Collegiate Athletic Association (CCAA). The team was led by head coach Paul Governali, in his fifth (and last) year, and played home games at Aztec Bowl. They finished the season with one win, six losses and one tie (1–6–1, 0–5–0 CCAA). The Aztecs were shutout four times and scored only 53 points in their eight games, while giving up 207.

Schedule

Team players in the NFL/AFL
No San Diego State players were selected in the 1961 NFL Draft or 1961 AFL Draft.

Notes

References

San Diego State
San Diego State Aztecs football seasons
San Diego State Aztecs football